Up with Donald Byrd is an album by American trumpeter Donald Byrd featuring performances by Byrd with Jimmy Heath, Stanley Turrentine, Herbie Hancock and Kenny Burrell recorded in 1964. It was released on the Verve label in 1965 as V/V6 8609.

Reception
The Allmusic review by Scott Yanow awarded the album 2 stars and stated "The music is mostly pretty forgettable despite such top sidemen... A lesser effort".  

It is important to consider Byrd's aim of attracting a larger African American audience by covering popular Blues (See See Rider, My Babe) and Gospel songs, at a time when Jazz was losing popularity.

Track listing
All compositions by Donald Byrd except as indicated
 "You're Talkin' About My Baby" (Gale Garnett, Walter Hirsch, Ray Rivera) - 2:39
 "Blind Man, Blind Man" (Herbie Hancock) - 2:51
 "Boom Boom" (John Lee Hooker) - 4:21
 "My Babe" (Willie Dixon) - 2:48
 "See See Rider" (Ma Rainey) - 3:58
 "House of the Rising Sun" (Traditional) - 5:05
 "Bossa" - 7:56
 "Cantaloupe Island" (Hancock) - 6:46
 "Sometimes I Feel Like a Motherless Child" (Traditional; arranged by Donald Byrd) - 5:13
Recorded at Rudy Van Gelder Studio, Englewood Cliffs, NJ on October 6 (tracks 1 & 2), November 2 (tracks 3-6), & December 16 (tracks 7-9), 1964 .

Personnel
Donald Byrd - trumpet; arranger and conductor (tracks 7 & 9)
Jimmy Heath (tracks 2–5), Stanley Turrentine (tracks 7 & 8) - tenor saxophone
Herbie Hancock - piano; arranger and conductor (track 8)
Kenny Burrell - guitar (tracks 1–8)
Bob Cranshaw (tracks 1–6), Ron Carter (tracks 7–9) - bass
Grady Tate - drums
Candido Camero - percussion (tracks 7 & 8)
The Donald Byrd Singers - vocals
Claus Ogerman - arranger and conductor (tracks 1–6)
Technical
Val Valentin - director of engineering
Phil Ramone, Rudy Van Gelder - engineer
Michael Malatak - cover design

References

1965 albums
Albums arranged by Claus Ogerman
Albums conducted by Claus Ogerman
Albums recorded at Van Gelder Studio
Albums produced by Creed Taylor
Donald Byrd albums
Verve Records albums